Wolfgang Overath (born 29 September 1943) is a former West German footballer.  A true one-club man, Overath spent his entire professional career at 1. FC Köln. He represented his country three times in World Cup finals, culminating in 1974 with the 2–1 victory over the Netherlands on home soil. Primarily an attacking midfielder, Overath was known for his passing ability, technique and outstanding left foot.

Career 

An attacking midfielder, Overath started playing football at SSV Siegburg, but spent the majority of his career at 1. FC Köln, appearing 765 times between 1962 and 1977 and scoring 287 goals. He won the inaugural Bundesliga with 1. FC Köln in 1964, overall he appeared in the first 14 seasons of the newly formed top-flight, and the German Cup in 1968. At European club level he played 71 matches (11 goals) for 1. FC Köln. He currently holds the all-time appearances record of the club (549 official matches played).

In total he won 81 caps for the national side between 1963 and 1974, scoring 17 goals. As well as the World Cup victory in 1974, he was at the heart of the West German midfield when they reached the final in 1966 and achieved third place in 1970. Overath scored the only goal in the latter match, with many foreign journalists voting him Germany's best player in Mexico.

Overath is one of only seven players (alongside his teammates Franz Beckenbauer, Jürgen Grabowski, Horst-Dieter Höttges, Sepp Maier, later compatriot Miroslav Klose, and Italian Franco Baresi) with World Cup medals for first, second and third place. A main rival in the national team for leading the midfield was the flamboyant Günter Netzer from Borussia Mönchengladbach, German Player of the year in 1972 and 73. However, German coach Helmut Schön preferred the more staid Overath.  An injury forced Overath out of the side before the quarterfinals of the European Championships 1972 where Netzer became alongside Franz Beckenbauer and Gerd Müller one of the outstanding protagonists leading the side, considered still Germany's best of all time, to victory in the final over the USSR. Overath soon regained his place ahead of Netzer, due to the latter's now being injured. Netzer himself said that Overath "was born to play for Germany".

In 2004, he was elected President of 1. FC Köln. He resigned on 13 November 2011.

Personal life 
Overath and his wife have three children: two sons and one adopted daughter. Also, he was named an honorary citizen of Siegburg in 2003. Overath was awarded the Egidius-Braun-Preis for his charity work.

Career statistics

Club

International

Honours

Club 
Köln
 Bundesliga: 1963–64
 DFB-Pokal: 1968, 1977

International 
Germany
 FIFA World Cup: 1974
 FIFA World Cup Second Place: 1966
 FIFA World Cup Third Place: 1970

Individual 
 kicker Bundesliga Team of the Season: 1965–66, 1967–68, 1969–70, 1973–74
 FIFA XI: 1968
 FIFA World Cup All-Star Team: 1974

References

External links
 

1943 births
Living people
People from Siegburg
Sportspeople from Cologne (region)
German footballers
Germany international footballers
Association football midfielders
1. FC Köln players
German football chairmen and investors
FIFA World Cup-winning players
1966 FIFA World Cup players
1970 FIFA World Cup players
1974 FIFA World Cup players
Bundesliga players
People from the Rhine Province
Officers Crosses of the Order of Merit of the Federal Republic of Germany
Footballers from North Rhine-Westphalia
West German footballers